James Thomas Farrell (February 27, 1904 – August 22, 1979) was an American novelist, short-story writer and poet.

He is most remembered for the Studs Lonigan trilogy, which was made into a film in 1960 and a television series in 1979.

Biography
Farrell was born in Chicago, to a large Irish-American family which included siblings Earl, Joseph, Helen, John and Mary. In addition, there were several other siblings who died during childbirth, as well as one who died from the great 1918 flu pandemic. His father was a teamster, and his mother a domestic servant. His parents were too poor to provide for him, and he went to live with his grandparents when he was three years old. Farrell attended Mt. Carmel High School, then known as St. Cyril, with future Egyptologist Richard Anthony Parker. He then later attended the University of Chicago. He began writing when he was 21 years old.  A novelist, journalist, and short story writer, he was known for his realistic descriptions of the working class South Side Irish, especially in the novels about the character Studs Lonigan.  Farrell based his writing on his own experiences, particularly those that he included in his celebrated "Danny O'Neill Pentalogy" series of five novels.

Among the writers who acknowledged Farrell as an inspiration was Norman Mailer:

Politics
Farrell was also active in Trotskyist politics and joined the Socialist Workers Party (SWP). He came to agree with Albert Goldman and Felix Morrows' criticism of the SWP and Fourth International management. With Goldman, he ended his participation with the group in 1946 to join the Workers' Party.

Within the Workers' Party, Goldman and Farrell worked closely. In 1948, they developed criticisms of its policies, claiming that the party should endorse the Marshall Plan and also Norman Thomas' presidential candidacy. Having come to believe that only capitalism
could defeat Stalinism, they left to join the Socialist Party of America. During the late 1960s, disenchanted with the political "center", while impressed with the SWP's involvement in the Civil Rights and US anti-Vietnam War movements, he reestablished communication with his former comrades of two decades earlier. Farrell attended one or more SWP-sponsored Militant Forum events (probably in NYC), but never rejoined the Trotskyist movement.

In 1976, he became a founding member of the neoconservative Committee on the Present Danger.

Marriages
Farrell was married three times, to two women. He married his first wife Dorothy Butler in 1931. After divorcing her, in 1941 he married stage actress Hortense Alden, with whom he had two sons, Kevin and John.  They divorced in 1955, and later that year he remarried Dorothy Farrell.  They separated again in 1958 but remained legally married until his death.  She died in 2005.

Legacy
According to William McCann:
No writer has described a specific area of American society so thoroughly and comprehensively as Farrell did in the seven novels of Studs Lonigan and Danny O'Neill (1932-43).  A consummate realist in viewpoint and method, he turned repeatedly in his fiction to the subject he knew best, the Irish Catholic neighborhood of Chicago's South Side. Drawing on lacerating personal experience, Farrell wrote about people who were victims of injurious social circumstances and of their own spiritual and intellectual shortcomings. He depicted human frustration, ignorance, cruelty, violence, and moral degeneration with sober, relentless veracity....Despite his Marxist leanings, Farrell's fiction is not that of a reformer, or a doctrinaire theorist, but rather the patient humorless representation of ways of life and states of mind he abhors....Farrell’s place in American letters, however, as certainly the most industrious and probably the most powerful writer in the naturalistic tradition stemming from Frank Norris and Dreiser, was solidly established with the Lonegan--O'Neil series....His later novels are lamented and ignored.

The Studs Lonigan trilogy was voted number 29 on the Modern Library's list of the 100 best novels of the 20th century.

On the 100th anniversary of Farrell's birth, Norman Mailer was a panelist at the New York Public Library's "James T. Farrell Centenary Celebration" on February 25, 2004 along with Pete Hamill, Arthur M. Schlesinger, Jr. and moderator Donald Yannella. They discussed Farrell's life and legacy.

In 1973, Farrell was awarded the St. Louis Literary Award from the Saint Louis University Library Associates.  In 2012, he was inducted into the Chicago Literary Hall of Fame.

Studs Terkel, the Chicago-based historian, took the name "Studs" from Farrell's famous character Studs Lonigan.

Bibliography
Young Lonigan (1932)
Gas-House McGinty (1933)
Calico Shoes (1934)
The Young Manhood of Studs Lonigan (1934)
Guillotine Party and Other Stories (1935)
Judgment Day (1935) This is the final part of the Studs Lonigan trilogy.
A Note on Literary Criticism (1936)
A World I Never Made (1936) (First book of the Danny O'Neill pentalogy)
Can All This Grandeur Perish? and Other Stories (1937)
No Star Is Lost (1938) (Second book of the Danny O'Neill pentalogy)
Tommy Gallagher's Crusade (1939)
Father and Son (1940) (Third book of the Danny O'Neill pentalogy)
The Bill of Rights in danger!: the meaning of the Minneapolis convictions [New York] : Civil Rights Defense Committee, (1941)
Decision (1941)
Ellen Rogers (1941)
"$1000 a Week and Other Stories" (1942)
My Days of Anger (1943) (Fourth book of the Danny O'Neill pentalogy)
"To Whom It May Concern and Other Stories" (1944)
Who are the 18 prisoners in the Minneapolis Labor Case?: how the Smith "Gag" Act has endangered workers rights and free speech [New York] : Civil Rights Defense Committee, (1944)
"The League of Frightened Philistines and Other Papers" (1945)
Bernard Clare (1946)
"When Boyhood Dreams Come True and Other Stories" (1946)
"The Life Adventurous and Other Stories" (1947)
Literature and Morality (1947)
Truth and myth about America New York, N.Y. : Rand School Press : Distributed by the Rand Bookstore (1949)
The Road Between (1949)
An American Dream Girl (1950)
The Name Is Fogarty: Private Papers on Public Matters (1950)
This Man and This Woman (1951)
Yet Other Waters (1952)
The Face of Time (1953) (Final book of the Danny O'Neill pentalogy)
Reflections at Fifty and Other Essays (1954)
French Girls Are Vicious and Other Stories (1955)
A Dangerous Woman and Other Stories (1957)
My Baseball Diary (1957)
It Has Come To Pass (1958)
Boarding House Blues (1961)
Side Street and Other Stories (1961)
"Sound of a City" (1962)
The Silence of History (1963)
What Time Collects (1964)
A Glass of Milk, in "Why Work Series" editor Gordon Lish (1966)
Lonely for the Future (1966)
When Time Was Born (1966)
New Year's Eve/1929 (1967)
A Brand New Life (1968)
Childhood Is Not Forever (1969)
Judith (1969) Signed limited edition, 300 printed
Invisible Swords (1971)
Judith and Other Stories (1973)
The Dunne Family (1976)
Olive and Mary Anne (1977)
The Death of Nora Ryan (1978)

Posthumous editions
Eight Short, Short Stories (1981)
Sam Holman (1994)
Hearing Out James T. Farrell: Selected Lectures (1997)
Studs Lonigan: A Trilogy, ed. Pete Hamill (New York: The Library of America, 2004) .
Dreaming Baseball, eds. Ron Briley, Margaret Davidson, and James Barbour (Kent, Ohio: Kent State University Press, 2007).

References

Further reading
 Douglas, Ann. "Studs Lonigan and the Failure of History in Mass Society: A Study in Claustrophobia." American Quarterly 29.5 (1977): 487-505 online.
 Ebest, Ron. "The Irish Catholic Schooling of James T. Farrell, 1914–23." Éire-Ireland 30.4 (1995): 18-32 excerpt.
 Fanning, Charles, and Ellen Skerrett. "James T. Farrell and Washington Park: The Novel as Social History." Chicago History 8 (1979): 80–91.
 Hricko, Mary. The Genesis of the Chicago Renaissance: Theodore Dreiser, Langston Hughes, Richard Wright, and James T. Farrell (Routledge, 2013).

 Salzman, Jack. "James T. Farrell: An Essay in Bibliography." Resources for American Literary Study 6.2 (1976): 131-163 online.

 Shiffman, Daniel. "Ethnic Competitors in Studs Lonigan." Melus 24.3 (1999): 67–79.

Primary sources
 Farrell, James T. "Literature and ideology." College English 3.7 (1942): 611-623 online.
 Flynn, Dennis, Jack Salzman, and James T. Farrell. "An Interview with James T. Farrell." Twentieth Century Literature 22.1 (1976): 1-10. online

External links

 
 The James T. Farrell Papers at The Newberry Library
 The James T. Farrell-Cleo Paturis Papers at The Newberry Library
 James T. Farrell, The Literary Encyclopedia
 "Revolutionary Novelist in Crisis", from The New York Intellectuals by Alan Wald
 Writers: James T. Farrell, Encyclopedia of Trotskyists Online
 James T. Farrell Biography Summary, BookRags
 Guide to the James T. Farrell Papers 1930-1948 at the University of Chicago Special Collections Research Center
 

1904 births
1979 deaths
20th-century American novelists
American people of Irish descent
Members of the Socialist Party of America
Members of the Socialist Workers Party (United States)
Members of the Workers Party (United States)
University of Chicago alumni
Writers from Chicago
Place of death missing
American male novelists
Novelists from Illinois
20th-century American male writers
Burials at Calvary Cemetery (Evanston, Illinois)
Members of the American Academy of Arts and Letters